General Tikka Khan  (10 February 1915 – 28 March 2002) was a Pakistan Army general who was the first Chief of Army Staff (COAS) from 3 March 1972 until retiring on 1 March 1976. Along with Yahya Khan, he is considered a chief architect of the 1971 Bangladesh genocide which according to independent researchers led to the deaths of 300,000 to 500,000 people.

Gaining a commission in 1940 as an artillery officer in the British Indian Army to participate in World War II, he rose to command the 8th and 15th infantry divisions in the war with India in 1965. In 1969, he was appointed as the commander of IV Corps while acting as martial law administrator in West Pakistan under President Yahya Khan. In 1971, he took over the command of army's Eastern Command in East Pakistan and appointed as Governor of East Pakistan where he oversaw the planning and the military deployments to execute the military operations to quell the liberation war efforts by the Awami League. His tough rhetoric to deal with political enemies earned him notoriety and a nickname of Touka (meaning Cleaver) and he was soon relieved of his command by President Yahya Khan.

After commanding the II Corps in the war with India in 1971, Tikka Khan was promoted to four-star rank and appointed as the first chief of army staff of the Pakistan Army in 1972. As an army chief, Tikka Khan provided support to the Pakistan nuclear programme alongside bureaucrat Ghulam Ishaq Khan. Upon retirement from the military in 1976, he was subsequently appointed as National Security Advisor by Prime Minister Zulfikar Ali Bhutto, only to be removed in 1977 as a result of enforced martial law. In the 1980s, he remained active as a political worker of the Pakistan Peoples Party (PPP) and emerged as its leader when appointed as Governor of Punjab after the general elections held in 1988. His tenure ended when President Ghulam Ishaq Khan dismissed Prime Minister Benazir Bhutto's government in 1990 and he was succeeded by Mian Muhammad Azhar. He retired from politics in 1990. He died on 28 March 2002 and was buried with full military honours in Westridge cemetery in Rawalpindi, Punjab, Pakistan.

Early life and World War II 
Tikka Khan Janjua was born on 10 February 1915 into a Punjabi family of Janjua Rajput clan, in Jochha Mamdot village of Kahuta Tehsil, Rawalpindi District, Punjab, British Indian Empire. After his education in Rawalpindi, he joined the Army Cadet College in Nowgong, Madhya Pradesh in 1933 and joined the British Indian Army as a sepoy in 1935; he gained his commission in the army from the Indian Military Academy on 22 December 1940.

During these early years he was known to be a particularly good boxer, with the famous British biographer Robert Payne describing him as "a heavy set man with a powerful chest and a boxer’s shoulders, and he would have been called handsome except for a rather swollen and misshapen nose acquired during a brief boxing career."

He participated in World War II and fought with the 2nd Field Regiment, Regiment of Artillery in Libya against the Afrika Korps led by German Field Marshal Erwin Rommel in 1940. He was captured by German troops and held as a POW in Libya for more than a year. After successfully escaping, he saw military action in the Burma campaign against Japan in 1945 where he was wounded and hospitalised for some time. In 1946, he was posted in different parts of India such as Deolali, Mathura, and Kalyan as an army officer.

During the same time, he served as an infantry instructor at the Indian Military Academy at Dehradun. His British superiors quietly suspected that Captain Tikka Khan was in the Academy not by merit but by favouritism. At GHQ India, Tikka Khan was often subjected to jokes by his British officers.

Career in Pakistan 
After the efforts of Pakistani nationalists culminated in the partition of British India and the creation of Pakistan, Tikka Khan joined the Pakistan Army as a major where he was the only artillery officer in the Pakistan Army's Regiment of Artillery in 1947. His military career progressed well and he got accelerated promotions in the army. In 1949, he was promoted to lieutenant colonel and commander of his unit. He worked hard to raise the Medium Regiment in the new army and commanded the first post of the artillery regiment. In 1950–54, he was promoted to colonel and became the deputy director (Dy Director) at the Regiment of Artillery.

In 1955, he was promoted to brigadier to command the Medium Regiment. In 1962, Tikka Khan was promoted to major general and posted at the GHQ in Rawalpindi.

Between the wars:1965–1971 

In 1965, Major-General Tikka Khan was the GOC of the 8th Infantry Division that was positioned in Punjab, Pakistan. At that time, the 8th Infantry Division consisted of the 51st Paratrooper Brigade and the 52nd Infantry Brigade. In April 1965, the 8th Infantry Division intruded into the Rann of Kutch from Southern Command. Hostilities broke out in 1965 between India and Pakistan and Tikka Khan's 8th Infantry Division engaged in battle with the Indian Army, notably in the tank battle in Chawinda, Punjab that is remembered as one of the largest tank battles in history since the Battle of Kursk in World War II. During the 1965 war, Tikka Khan earned a reputation as a victor of Rann of Kutch and was credited widely by the print media for the victories he gained over the Indian Army. He made a bold stand against the Indian Army's encirclement in the Sialkot sector in 1965. He also led the 15th Infantry Division in the 1965 war.

After President Ayub Khan handed over the presidency to his army chief General Yahya Khan in 1969, Tikka Khan was promoted to lieutenant general to command the IV Corps, stationed in Lahore. He was the martial law administrator of Punjab under President Yahya Khan who appointed him after replacing with Attiqur Rahman. His personality was well known in Pakistan as being tough and ruthless. In March 1971, Tikka Khan was sent to Dacca and left the post to Lieutenant General Bahadur Sher in March 1971.

Bangladesh Liberation and 1971 war

Governorship and 1971 war 

The situation was very complex in both West and East Pakistan after the general elections held in 1970 where the Bengali nationalist Awami League won 160 of the 162 seats in East Pakistan, whereas the leftist-socialist Pakistan Peoples Party (PPP) won 81 seats out of 138 in West Pakistan. By constitutional law, Sheikh Mujibur Rahman of the Awami League was supposed to be the candidate for the post of Prime Minister of Pakistan but Zulfikar Ali Bhutto of the Pakistan Peoples Party was not ready to accept his role as Leader of the Opposition and refused to sit in the National Assembly in this role.

Under pressure by Bhutto and the Pakistan Peoples Party, President Yahya Khan postponed the National Assembly session despite meeting with and inviting the Awami League to form the government on 7 March. Sheikh Mujibur Rahman reacted by calling upon the Bengali people to launch an armed liberation movement against Pakistan at a mass rally. Responding to this, President Yahya Khan accepted the resignation of Lieutenant General Yaqub Khan as governor of East Pakistan and commander of the army's Eastern Command in March 1971 and appointed Lieutenant General Tikka Khan as his successor. Tikka Khan arrived in Dacca the same month and took over the governorship. He assumed command of the Eastern Command on 7 March 1971. He has faced accusations of killing thousands of civilians. 

Acting on the instructions of President Yahya Khan's administration, Lieutenant General Tikka Khan began preparations of "direct-wise military operation" against the Awami League on the evening of 25 March 1971. Tikka Khan's order to his soldiers was I want the land and not the people. Tikka Khan took assistance from loyal Bengalis and Biharis for the operation and organized a paramilitary force called Razakars. He ordered the arrest of Sheikh Mujibur Rahman, outlawed the Awami League and ordered a midnight attack on the University of Dhaka. Tikka Khan was the architect and top planner of Operation Searchlight. Thousands were killed in this operation, including academics and other members of civil society, and the country was plunged into a bloody civil war. Tikka Khan followed the classical "Seek and destroy and Infiltration" method and captured all radio stations in East Pakistan at the price of systematic killings of Bengali people. In Pakistan, he was called "a soldier known for his eager use of force." He became notorious as the "Butcher of Bengal."

In West Pakistan, domestic criticism and disapproval of Lieutenant General Tikka Khan grew to the point that President Yahya Khan replaced him with a civilian government led by a governor and a cabinet drawn from different political parties. Tikka Khan was recalled to Pakistan, relinquishing the Eastern Command to Lieutenant General Amir Khan Niazi, and given command of the II Strike Corps based in Multan, Punjab. He commanded the II Strike Corps during the 1971 war with India. Indian Major General D. K. Palit has questioned the wisdom of Tikka Khan's tactics used in the Battle of Chhamb in December, citing high II Corps casualties incurred during Pakistani frontal attacks.

Chief of Army staff 

In 1972, President Zulfikar Ali Bhutto removed Lieutenant General Gul Hassan Khan from his position as commander-in-chief of the army and reorganized the army leadership to replace the position with that of the Chief of Army Staff (COAS). Bhutto then promoted Tikka Khan to four-star general and appointed him as COAS. Tikka Khan was a highly unpopular choice in military circles for the chief of army staff because it was felt strongly that he was professionally unprepared for the assignment. On the other hand, Tikka Khan was steadfastly loyal to Bhutto. In 1972, he supported the militarisation of the Pakistan Atomic Energy Commission by supporting Munir Ahmad Khan to take over the commission's chairmanship and the directorship of the clandestine atomic bomb programme. He was implicated in the Hamoodur Rahman Commission's report on the 1971 war with India over East Pakistan, but much of the report remains classified.

In 1974, Tikka Khan led the counterinsurgency military operation in Balochistan and successfully crushed Baloch independence movement. In 1976, he provided his support to Ghulam Ishaq Khan and Bhutto to expand the clandestine nuclear weapons programme. The same year, Tikka Khan was preparing to retire from the military, and evaluated the eight serving lieutenant generals who were his potential successors as chief of army staff. When asked by Bhutto for his opinion on Lieutenant General Muhammad Zia-ul-Haq, Tikka Khan did not recommend him. Tikka Khan later remarked, "I thought he was dull. In any case, he was the most junior of all the eight lieutenant generals." However Bhutto by-passed his recommendations, approved Lieutenant General Zia-ul-Haq to four-star rank, and appointed him as army chief. Upon retirement from the army, Khan joined the Pakistan Peoples Party.

Political career

National security advisor and governor of Punjab 
Tikka Khan was appointed National Security Advisor in 1976 by Prime Minister Zulfikar Ali Bhutto. However, his tenure was short and ended when martial law was imposed by army chief General Muhammad Zia-ul-Haq in 1977. General Zia ordered the military police to arrest both Bhutto and General Tikka Khan and placed them under house arrest. Bhutto was executed in 1979, after which General Tikka Khan emerged as one of the leaders of the Pakistan Peoples Party (PPP), becoming its Secretary General at a time when many party stalwarts abandoned it.

In 1980–88, Tikka Khan faced imprisonment numerous times for his political activities until President Zia-ul-Haq died in August 1988 in an aircraft explosion over Bahawalpur. In spite of Tikka's leadership position within the political opposition, many of his army protégés such as Sawar Khan, Iqbal Khan and Rahimuddin Khan were promoted to four-star rank and remained on deferential terms with him. In the 1988 general election, Tikka Khan ran unsuccessfully for a seat representing Rawalpindi. He was appointed as the Governor of Punjab by Prime Minister Benazir Bhutto in December 1988. His governorship ended when President Ghulam Ishaq Khan dismissed the government of Prime Minister Benazir Bhutto in August 1990, after which Tikka Khan retired from active politics.

Later life and death 

In retirement, Tikka Khan lived a quiet life in Rawalpindi, Punjab. Throughout the 1990s, he battled with illness and was hospitalised in CMH Rawalpindi for several years. He refused many television interviews on the subject of the controversial events of 1971 and died on 28 March 2002.

He was laid to rest with military honours in the Westridge cemetery in Rawalpindi. Chairman Joint Chiefs of Staff Committee Aziz Khan attended his funeral, accompanied by the Army Chief of Staff, Chief of Air Staff, Chief of Naval Staff and other senior military and civil officials. Former prime minister and PPP chairperson Benazir Bhutto paid Tikka Khan tribute in a message to his son Colonel Khalid Masud; she described the Colonel's father as one who "rose to the highest offices of this country due to his hard work and respect for the rule of law."

Awards and decorations

Foreign Decorations

See also 
 The Blood telegram

References

Further reading 
 Zaheer, Hasan: The separation of East Pakistan : The rise and realisation of Bengali Muslim nationalism, Oxford University Press, 1994.
 Sisson, Richard & Rose, Leo: War and secession : Pakistan, India, and the creation of Bangladesh, University of California Press (Berkeley), 1990.
 Matinuddin, General Kamal: Tragedy of Errors : East Pakistan Crisis, 1968–1971, Wajidalis, Lahore, Pakistan, 1994.
 Salik, Siddiq: Witness to surrender, Oxford University Press, Karachi, Pakistan, 1977.

External links 
 Official profile at Pakistan Army website
 Tikka Khan Passes Away—DAWN
 Article rebutting General A.A.K. Niazi's accusations against General Tikka Khan, by Nasir M. Khan, Pakistan Link, 30 March 2001
 Article mentioning General Tikka Khan's tenure as Chief of Army Staff (1972–1976), A.R. Siddiqui, Dawn, 14 September 2003.
 Hamood-ur-Rehman Commission Report, The Report of the Commission of Inquiry – 1971 War as Declassified by The Government of Pakistan, Volume-I: Supplementary Report – Top secret, PART III – MILITARY ASPECT, CHAPTER VI.
 Hamood-ur-Rehman Commission Report, The Report of the Commission of Inquiry – 1971 War as Declassified by The Government of Pakistan, Volume-I: Supplementary Report – Top secret, PART IV – SURRENDER IN EAST PAKISTAN, CHAPTER II – Alleged atrocities by the Pakistan Army.
 Hamood-ur-Rehman Commission Report, The Report of the Commission of Inquiry – 1971 War as Declassified by The Government of Pakistan, PART IV – MILITARY ASPECT, Chapter III, The formulation of defence plans.
 Hamood-ur-Rehman Commission Report, The Report of the Commission of Inquiry – 1971 War as Declassified by The Government of Pakistan, Volume-I: Supplementary Report – Top secret, PART IV – SURRENDER IN EAST PAKISTAN, CHAPTER I – The moral aspect.
 Hamood-ur-Rehman Commission Report, The Report of the Commission of Inquiry – 1971 War as Declassified by The Government of Pakistan, PART V: MISCELLANEOUS, CHAPTER VI: Summary and recommendations.
 Amin Fahim pays rich tributes to General Tikka Khan, Dawn, 5 April 2002.
 General Yahya Khan agreed to withdraw forces, India did not, by Khalid Hasan, Daily Times, 3 July 2005.

|-

|-

|-

|-

|-

1915 births
2002 deaths
Bangladesh Liberation War
British Indian Army officers
Causes and prelude of the Bangladesh Liberation War
Chiefs of Army Staff, Pakistan
Controversies in Pakistan
Escapees from Italian detention
Generals of the Bangladesh Liberation War
Generals of the Indo-Pakistani War of 1971
Governors of East Pakistan
Governors of West Pakistan
Governors of Punjab, Pakistan
Indian Army personnel of World War II
Indian escapees
Indian prisoners of war
Military personnel of the Indo-Pakistani War of 1965
Pakistan Army Artillery Corps officers
Pakistani generals
Pakistan People's Party politicians
People from Kallar Syedan Tehsil
People of the insurgency in Balochistan
World War II prisoners of war held by Germany
World War II prisoners of war held by Italy
1971 controversies
1971 Bangladesh genocide perpetrators
Pakistan Command and Staff College alumni